Gonzalo Heredia (born 23 April 1962) is an Argentine sailor. He competed in the 470 event at the 1984 Summer Olympics.

References

External links
 

1962 births
Living people
Argentine male sailors (sport)
Olympic sailors of Argentina
Sailors at the 1984 Summer Olympics – 470
Place of birth missing (living people)